Patriarchate of Peć may refer to:

 Patriarchate of Peć (monastery), Eastern Orthodox Patriarchal Monastery of the Serbian Orthodox Church, near the city of Peć
 Serbian Patriarchate of Peć, medieval Serbian Patriarchate, with seat in Patriarchal Monastery of Peć, from 1346 to 1766
 Serbian Orthodox Church, common contemporary name for the Serbian Patriarchate of Peć

See also
 Serbian Patriarchate (disambiguation)